Jozef Adámik (born 10 April 1985) is a Slovak football defender who plays for SK Vorwärts Steyr.

Career

Club career
He came to Spartak Trnava in summer 2013.

References

External links
 
 
 Jozef Adámik at Futbalnet 

1985 births
Living people
Sportspeople from Komárno
Slovak footballers
Slovak expatriate footballers
ŠK Slovan Bratislava players
FK Dubnica players
FK Dukla Banská Bystrica players
1. FC Tatran Prešov players
FC Baník Ostrava players
FC Spartak Trnava players
KFC Komárno players
Slovak Super Liga players
2. Liga (Slovakia) players
Czech First League players
Association football defenders
Expatriate footballers in the Czech Republic
Expatriate footballers in Austria
Slovak expatriate sportspeople in the Czech Republic
Slovak expatriate sportspeople in Austria